The 2020 Southern Miss Golden Eagles football team represented the University of Southern Mississippi in the 2020 NCAA Division I FBS football season. The Golden Eagles played their home games at the M. M. Roberts Stadium in Hattiesburg, Mississippi, and competed in the West Division of Conference USA (CUSA). Head coach Jay Hopson, who was in his fifth year, resigned after one game and was replaced by interim head coach Scotty Walden. Walden himself resigned after four games to become the head coach at Austin Peay and was replaced by Tim Billings.

Previous season
The Golden Eagles finished the 2019 regular season 7–6, 5–3 in CUSA play to finish in third in the West Division. The team was invited to play in the Armed Forces Bowl against Tulane, where the Golden Eagles took their sixth loss of the season.

Preseason

Award watch lists 
Listed in the order that they were released

CUSA media days
The CUSA Media Days will be held virtually for the first time in conference history.

Preseason All-CUSA teams
To be released

Schedule
Southern Miss announced its 2020 football schedule on January 8, 2020. The 2020 schedule consists of 6 home and 6 away games in the regular season.

The Golden Eagles had games scheduled against Auburn, Jackson State, Tennessee Tech and UTEP that were canceled due to the COVID-19 pandemic. It was announced on August 6, 2020 that Auburn would be replaced by Tulane and Jackson State would be replaced by Tennessee Tech.

Game summaries

South Alabama

Louisiana Tech

Tulane

at North Texas

at Liberty

Rice

North Alabama

at Western Kentucky

UTSA

Florida Atlantic

References

Southern Miss
Southern Miss Golden Eagles football seasons
Southern Mississippi Golden Eagles football